In enzymology, a succinyldiaminopimelate transaminase is an enzyme that catalyzes the chemical reaction

N-succinyl-L-2,6-diaminoheptanedioate + 2-oxoglutarate  N-succinyl-L-2-amino-6-oxoheptanedioate + L-glutamate

Thus, the two substrates of this enzyme are N-succinyl-L-2,6-diaminoheptanedioate and 2-oxoglutarate, whereas its two products are N-succinyl-L-2-amino-6-oxoheptanedioate and L-glutamate.

This enzyme belongs to the family of transferases, specifically the transaminases, which transfer nitrogenous groups.  The systematic name of this enzyme class is N-succinyl-L-2,6-diaminoheptanedioate:2-oxoglutarate aminotransferase. Other names in common use include succinyldiaminopimelate aminotransferase, and N-succinyl-L-diaminopimelic glutamic transaminase.  This enzyme participates in lysine biosynthesis.  It employs one cofactor, pyridoxal phosphate.

References 

 

EC 2.6.1
Pyridoxal phosphate enzymes
Enzymes of unknown structure